Omran Sharaf (born 1984) is an Emirati engineer who is the project manager of the United Arab Emirates' first mission to Mars, the Emirates Mars Mission. He is also the director of the programs management department at the Mohammed bin Rashid Space Centre, a United Arab Emirates Space Agency.

Early life and education 
Sharaf was born in Dubai. He graduated from the University of Virginia in 2005 with a bachelor's degree in electrical engineering and earned a master's degree in 2013 from KAIST. His dissertation was title "A Satellite for Knowledge Economy: Knowledge Transfer in the UAE Space Program".

Career 
In 2006, he was recruited as the first employee to join the newly established Emirates Institution for Advanced Science and Technology (EIAST). He lived in South Korea for seven years, working on the Command and Data Handling Subsystem of DubaiSat-1. On EIAST's second EO mission, DubaiSat-2, Omran worked on the Systems Engineering in addition to the Command & Data Handling Subsystem. He was assigned as Director of Space Images Processing & Analysis Department from the 2011-2014.

References

Space program of the United Arab Emirates
1984 births
Emirati electrical engineers
Living people
Emirati scientists
Emirati expatriates in South Korea
KAIST alumni
University of Virginia School of Engineering and Applied Science alumni